Anachis kraussii is a species of sea snail in the family Columbellidae, the dove snails.

Subspecies
 Anachis kraussii kitchingi (Sowerby III, 1894)
 Anachis kraussii kraussii (Sowerby I, 1844)

Description
The shell size varies between 5 mm and 8 mm

The small, elongated-tuureted shell has a short spire and an acute apex. The color of the shell is white, adorned with red angulate bands. The shell contains 8 convex whorls with longitudinal plicate ribs (11 obtuse ribs in the penultimate whorl). The suture is simple. The oblique interstices are smooth. The body whorl is subcostate. The base of the shell is transversely striated. The white aperture is ovate, becoming blunt at the top. The outer lip is sharp and smooth inside. The siphonal canal is short.

Distribution
This marine species occurs off Southwest and Southeast Africa.

References

 Spry, J.F. (1961). The sea shells of Dar es Salaam: Gastropods. Tanganyika Notes and Records 56
 Steyn, D.G. & Lussi, M. (1998) Marine Shells of South Africa. An Illustrated Collector’s Guide to Beached Shells. Ekogilde Publishers, Hartebeespoort, South Africa, ii + 264 pp. page(s): 102
 Kilburn R.N. & Marais J.P. (2010) Columbellidae. pp. 60–104, in: Marais A.P. & Seccombe A.D. (eds), Identification guide to the seashells of South Africa. Volume 1. Groenkloof: Centre for Molluscan Studies. 376 pp.
 Monsecour, K. (2010). Checklist of Columbellidae.

External links
 

kraussii
Gastropods described in 1844